Mount Black Prince may refer to:

 Mount Black Prince (Alberta) in Alberta, Canada
 Mount Black Prince in the Admiralty Mountains of Antarctica